Takeshi Noma ( Noma Takeshi; 3 April 1934 – 11 March 2023) was a Japanese politician. A member of the Liberal Democratic Party, he served in the House of Councillors from 1992 to 2004.

Noma died on 11 March 2023, at the age of 88.

References

1934 births
2023 deaths
20th-century Japanese politicians
21st-century Japanese politicians
Members of the House of Councillors (Japan)
Liberal Democratic Party (Japan) politicians
Meiji University alumni
People from Imabari, Ehime